Brendan Doran (born March 17, 1979) is an American former ski jumper who competed in the 1998 Winter Olympics and in the 2002 Winter Olympics. He was born in Long Beach, California.

He measures at 185 cm and is 73 kg.

References

1979 births
Living people
American male ski jumpers
Olympic ski jumpers of the United States
Ski jumpers at the 1998 Winter Olympics
Ski jumpers at the 2002 Winter Olympics
Sportspeople from Long Beach, California